Reinhard Wawra (born 7 February 1973) is an Austrian former professional tennis player.

Wawra, while competing in junior tennis, was a Petits As singles champion and an Orange Bowl runner-up.

On the professional tour, Wawra made ATP Tour singles main draw appearances at the Vienna Open in 1990 and Austrian Open Kitzbühel in 1991. He featured in qualifying at the 1991 Australian Open, was a finalist at the 1992 Vienna Challenger and reached his career high singles ranking of 293 in the 1995 season.

References

External links
 
 

1973 births
Living people
Austrian male tennis players